The 1788 United States Senate election in Pennsylvania, held on September 30, 1788, was the first United States Senate election held in Pennsylvania. The Pennsylvania General Assembly, consisting of the House of Representatives and the Senate, elected Pennsylvania's first two United States Senators, William Maclay and Robert Morris.

Results

Anti-Federalist William Maclay was elected to the two-year staggered term of the Class I seat, while Federalist and American Founding Father Robert Morris was elected to the full six-year term of the Class III seat. While no official results of the votes were recorded, the State House recorded minutes of its election:

Upon the expiration of Senator Maclay's term in 1791, the State House of Representatives would not be able to elect a new United States Senator due to a dispute regarding the rules and procedures of the election. The seat was finally filled in a 1793 election.

See also 
 1788–89 United States Senate elections

References

External links
Pennsylvania Election Statistics: 1682-2006 from the Wilkes University Election Statistics Project

1788
Pennsylvania
United States Senate